The 2014 Baku Cup was a professional tennis tournament played on hard courts. This was the fourth edition of the tournament, which was part of the 2014 WTA Tour. It took place in Baku, Azerbaijan between 21 and 27 July 2014.

Points and prize money

Point distribution

Prize money

Singles main-draw entrants

Seeds

 1 Rankings are as of July 14, 2014

Other entrants
The following players received wildcards into the singles main draw:
  Ksenia Gaydarzhi
  Ons Jabeur
  Nazrin Jafarova

The following players received entry from the qualifying draw:
  Nigina Abduraimova
  Kateryna Bondarenko
  Vesna Dolonc
  Misa Eguchi
  Danka Kovinić
  Olga Savchuk

Withdrawals
Before the tournament
  Mona Barthel
  Klára Koukalová
  Zhang Shuai

Retirements
  Alison Van Uytvanck (gastrointestinal illness)

Doubles main-draw entrants

Seeds

 1 Rankings are as of July 14, 2014

Other entrants 
The following pairs received wildcards into the doubles main draw:
  Tamari Chalaganidze /  Nazrin Šafářová
  Oleksandra Korashvili /  Tereza Martincová

Retirements 
  Francesca Schiavone (right lower leg injury)

Champions

Singles

  Elina Svitolina def.  Bojana Jovanovski, 6–1, 7–6(7–2)

Doubles

  Alexandra Panova /  Heather Watson def.  Raluca Olaru /  Shahar Pe'er, 6–2, 7–6(7–3)

External links
 Official website

Baku Cup
Baku Cup
2014 in Azerbaijani sport